Mael Seachlainn mac Conchobar Maenmaige Ua Conchobair was Prince of Connacht. He died in 1219.

Mael Seachlainn was a son of King Conchobar Maenmaige Ua Conchobair of Connacht (assassinated 1189) and a grandson of King of Ireland, Ruaidrí Ua Conchobair. 

The Annals of the Four Masters, sub anno 1219, state that "Melaghlin, the son of Conor Moinmoy, was slain by Manus, the son of Turlough O'Conor, who had taken his house (by force) at Cloontuskert."

Sources
Annals of Ulster
Annals of the Four Masters
Annals of Connacht
O'Byrne, Emmet. War, Politics and the Irish of Lenister 1156-1606, 2004.

1219 deaths
Medieval Gaels from Ireland
13th-century Irish people
People from Ballinasloe
People from County Galway
O'Conor dynasty
Year of birth unknown